The Samsung Galaxy Pocket Plus is an Android smartphone manufactured by Samsung that was released in January 2013 as the successor to the original Samsung Galaxy Pocket. The handset is still budget-oriented, with a relatively small 2.8-inch LCD. Its specifications are similar to that of the original Samsung Galaxy Pocket, with only minor upgrades such as the OS which is Android 4.0 ICS and the internal storage. The Pocket Plus is powered by an 850 MHz processor and offers connectivity options including 3G, Wi-Fi and Bluetooth 4.0. Internally, it comes with an upgraded 4 GB of storage which can be further expanded to up to 32 GB using a microSD card, and with 1200 mAh Li-ion battery.

Features
The Samsung Galaxy Pocket Plus comes with a 2.80 inch QVGA Display. The device includes a 1200 mAh Li-ion Battery, and offers connectivity options including EDGE, HSDPA, Wi-Fi(b.g.n) and Bluetooth connectivity. It also features GPS 2.0, a 2MP Rear Camera, a single SIM slot and the Social Hub app. The Social Hub combines every account registered on the phone to be unified in a single app. 
The phone runs Samsung's TouchWiz Nature UX skinned Android 4.0.4 Ice Cream Sandwich. The Samsung Galaxy Pocket Plus is still marketed as "Pocket Friendly," because it can be slipped inside pockets easily. It has been preferred highly by people with visual impairments mainly because of its Android 4.0.4 Ice Cream Sandwich operating system as it functions well with explore by touch, unlike other versions of Android (operating system)

See also
Samsung Galaxy Pocket Neo, successor released in June 2013
Samsung Galaxy Y
Samsung Galaxy Mini
Samsung i5500 (Galaxy 5)

Notes

External links 

Samsung mobile phones
Samsung Galaxy
Samsung smartphones
Android (operating system) devices
Mobile phones introduced in 2013